Helicopsis austriaca is a species of air-breathing land snail, terrestrial pulmonate gastropod mollusk in the family Geomitridae, the hairy snails and their allies. 

This species is endemic to Austria.

Description

The right-coiled, semi-globular shell of Helicopsis austriaca is about 2.9-5.2 high and 4.9-8.4 broad, with about 4-4.5 whorls and shows strong ribs. Some individuals, at least 20% of each population, show a slight pronounced keel. The basic colour of the shell is creme-white with some brown colour bands.
Like other representatives of the Genus Helicopsis it has four dart sacks, but only two of them contain love darts. The outer shape of the penis resembles a club or ball, the penis itself is very variable in morphology, with partly open penial walls that are occasionally fused with the penis sheath This led to various arrangements of lacunae around the seminal duct.
Similar species are H. striata and H. hungarica. The latter one can be unambiguously separated from  H. austriaca, as it has bigger shell dimensions. However small shells of H. striata can be confused with those of unkeeled specimens of H. austriaca. In this case a dissection ist required, as the internal genital characters of H. austriaca and H. striata are unique for each species.

Taxonomy
H. austriaca was originally described as a new species of Helicopsis, but became later on a subspecies of H. striata. A recent comprehensive survey showed, that both H. austriaca and H. hungarica are no subspecies of H. striata, but separate species.

Habitat and protection
H. austriaca inhabits two different types of habitat, which represent both primary natural steppe:

 Former river banks in southern parts of the Vienna basin, characterized by dolomite gravel, where it was described first.
 Boulder fields in the eastern margins of the Northern Calcareous Alps, within natural Austrian pine forests. In this habitat it was discovered recently.

This species occurs only in Lower Austria. Under its former subspecific affiliation Helicopsis striata austriaca it is mentioned in the Annex II of the Habitats Directive.

References

 Balashov, I. A., Neiber, M. T. & Hausdorf, B. (2020). Phylogeny, species delimitation and population structure of the steppe-inhabiting land snail genus Helicopsis in Eastern Europe. Zoological Journal of the Linnean Society. 1–18, 8 figures

External links
Working group Alpine land snails: Small heath snails – major questions: Initial attempts to clarify the situation of Helicopsis striata in Austria

Geomitridae
Fauna of Austria
Gastropods described in 1969
Endemic fauna of Austria